When We Were Boys is the seventh studio album by American country music duo The Bellamy Brothers. It was released in 1982 via Elektra and Curb Records. The album includes the singles "For All the Wrong Reasons" and "Get into Reggae Cowboy".

Track listing

Personnel
Adapted from liner notes.

Bellamy Brothers Band
David Bellamy - lead and harmony vocals, acoustic guitar, accordion
Howard Bellamy - lead and harmony vocals, acoustic guitar
Randy Ferrell - electric & acoustic guitars, banjo
Donnie Helms - bass guitar
Dannie Jones - steel guitar, lap steel guitar, dobro
Jon LaFrandre - keyboards, background vocals
Juan Perez - drums, percussion

Guest Musicians
Buddy Spicher - fiddle
John Hummerick - mandolin
Wally Dentz - harmonica
The Darby Angels (Ginger Bellamy Clements & Lucille Musser) - background vocals on "When We All Get to Heaven"

Chart performance

References

1982 albums
The Bellamy Brothers albums
Albums produced by Jimmy Bowen
Elektra Records albums
Curb Records albums